Hinck and Hincks are surnames, and may refer to:

Hinck
 Jon Hinck (born 1954), American environmentalist

Hincks
 Carroll C. Hincks (1889–1964), federal judge in the United States
 Sir Cecil Hincks (1894–1963), Australian politician
 Edward Hincks (1792–1866), Irish Assyriologist and clergyman
 Edward Winslow Hincks (1830-1894), career United States Army officer who served as a brigadier general during the American Civil War
 Francis Hincks (1807–1885), Irish born Canadian politician
 Thomas Hincks (naturalist) (1818–1899), British and Irish Unitarian minister and naturalist.
 Thomas Dix Hincks (1767–1857), Irish orientalist, naturalist and clergyman
 Walter Douglas Hincks (1906-1961), British entomologist

See also
 Hicks (disambiguation)
 Hinks